Semisuturia is a genus of parasitic flies in the family Tachinidae. There are about nine described species in Semisuturia.

Species
These nine species belong to the genus Semisuturia:
 Semisuturia australis (Malloch, 1933)
 Semisuturia flaviceps Malloch
 Semisuturia flavicornis Malloch
 Semisuturia flavifrons (Malloch, 1930)
 Semisuturia inermis (Malloch, 1933)
 Semisuturia mellea (Wiedemann, 1824)
 Semisuturia pahangensis (Malloch, 1927)
 Semisuturia parviseta (Malloch, 1930)
 Semisuturia robusta (Wulp, 1881)

References

Further reading

 
 
 
 

Tachinidae
Articles created by Qbugbot